Albany Academy (formerly Albany Science College, Albany High School and St Alban's) is a secondary school with academy status located on the south side of Chorley, Lancashire, England.

Albany Academy has specialist status in science and was one of the first schools in the country to convert to academy status. The school is the founding member of the Albany Learning Trust, a Multi-academy trust - the first Trust of its type in Lancashire.

History

Secondary school
The school was originally opened as St. Alban's, and was built on the former Yarrow House next to the river of the same name. 
In 1982, the School adopted a new name, Albany High School, and was subsequently renamed Albany Science College, before becoming Albany Academy when it converted to academy status.

Buildings
The former house was the birthplace and childhood home of Titanic first mate Charles Lightoller. This has been commemorated by a blue plaque on the school gates and the renaming of the school's canteen to Lightoller's Diner.

Albany Academy has a long and successful history in engaging with the local community. They have developed opportunities and social activities focused on leisure, health and career development. In addition, a wide range of services and facilities available to hire by community groups, local sports clubs and businesses in the local area.

Facilities are available for hire seven days a week, 50 weeks of the year. These include: Sports Hall, Gymnasium, Fully fitted fitness suite Classrooms with ICT facilities and large hall with stage and a sports field which can host a wide range of events. All facilities have full disability access including a lift onto the stage.

Educational Results
Albany Academy is consistently one of the top ten performing schools in Lancashire. The school is outstanding in pupil behaviour and safety and is also outstanding in leadership and management

The school also consistently gets outstanding GCSE results; the school always attains the national average, six of the pupils getting the brand new grade 9 score in English language, English literature and Maths. This grade is equivalent to A**. The school has also never achieved below A*-C in art and design and photography.

Media
The school appeared on the TV Show Canteen Rescue in 2010, after winning an award to have the school canteen re-decorated. The theme was a 1950s style American Diner.

Employment
Albany Academy is accredited as a Living Wage Employer

References

External links 
Albany Academy Website
Latest Ofsted Reports
Albany Academy Youtube Channel

Schools in Chorley
Educational institutions established in 1960
1960 establishments in England
Secondary schools in Lancashire
Academies in Lancashire